Cocaine (from , from , ultimately from Quechua: kúka) is a central nervous system (CNS) stimulant. As an extract it is mainly used recreationally and often illegally for its euphoric effects. It is also used in medicine by Indigenous South Americans for various purposes and rarely as a local anaesthetic elsewhere. It is primarily obtained from the leaves of two Coca species native to South America: Erythroxylum coca and E. novogranatense. After extraction from the plant, and further processing into cocaine hydrochloride (powdered cocaine), the drug is administered by being either snorted, applied topically to the mouth, or dissolved and injected into a vein. It can also then be turned into free base form (crack cocaine), in which it can be heated until sublimated and then the vapours can be inhaled. 

Cocaine stimulates the reward pathway in the brain. Mental effects may include an intense feeling of happiness, sexual arousal, loss of contact with reality, or agitation. Physical effects may include a fast heart rate, sweating, and dilated pupils. High doses can result in high blood pressure or high body temperature. Effects begin within seconds to minutes of use and last between five and ninety minutes. As cocaine also has numbing and blood vessel constriction properties, it is occasionally used during surgery on the throat or inside of the nose to control pain, bleeding, and vocal cord spasm.

Cocaine crosses the blood–brain barrier via a proton-coupled organic cation antiporter and (to a lesser extent) via passive diffusion across cell membranes. Cocaine blocks the dopamine transporter, inhibiting reuptake of dopamine from the synaptic cleft into the pre-synaptic axon terminal; the higher dopamine levels in the synaptic cleft increase dopamine receptor activation in the post-synaptic neuron, causing euphoria and arousal. Cocaine also blocks the serotonin transporter and norepinephrine transporter, inhibiting reuptake of serotonin and norepinephrine from the synaptic cleft into the pre-synaptic axon terminal and increasing activation of serotonin receptors and norepinephrine receptors in the post-synaptic neuron, contributing to the mental and physical effects of cocaine exposure.

A single dose of cocaine induces tolerance to the drug's effects. Repeated use is likely to result in cocaine addiction. Addicts who abstain from cocaine experience cocaine craving and drug withdrawal, with depression, decreased libido, decreased ability to feel pleasure and fatigue. Use of cocaine increases the overall risk of death and intravenous use particularly increases the risk of trauma and infectious diseases such as blood infections and HIV. It also increases risk of stroke, heart attack, cardiac arrhythmia, lung injury (when smoked), and sudden cardiac death. Illicitly sold cocaine is commonly adulterated with fentanyl, local anesthetics, levamisole, cornstarch, quinine, or sugar, which can result in additional toxicity. In 2017, the Global Burden of Disease study found that cocaine use caused around 7,300 deaths annually.

Uses 
Coca leaves have been used by Andean civilizations since ancient times. In ancient Wari culture, Incan culture, and through modern successor indigenous cultures of the Andes mountains, coca leaves are chewed, taken orally in the form of a tea, or alternatively, prepared in a sachet wrapped around alkaline burnt ashes, and held in the mouth against the inner cheek; it has traditionally been used to combat the effects of cold, hunger, and altitude sickness. Cocaine was first isolated from the leaves in 1860.

Globally, in 2019, cocaine was used by an estimated 20 million people (0.4% of adults aged 15 to 64 years). The highest prevalence of cocaine use was in Australia and New Zealand (2.1%), followed by North America (2.1%), Western and Central Europe (1.4%), and South and Central America (1.0%). Since 1961, the Single Convention on Narcotic Drugs has required countries to make recreational use of cocaine a crime. In the United States, cocaine is regulated as a Schedule II drug under the Controlled Substances Act, meaning that it has a high potential for abuse and has an accepted medical use for treatment. While rarely used medically today, its accepted uses are as a topical local anesthetic for the upper respiratory tract as well as to reduce bleeding in the mouth, throat and nasal cavities.

Medical 

Topical cocaine is sometimes used as a local numbing agent and vasoconstrictor to help control pain and bleeding with surgery of the nose, mouth, throat or lacrimal duct. Although some absorption and systemic effects may occur, the use of cocaine as a topical anesthetic and vasoconstrictor is generally safe, rarely causing cardiovascular toxicity, glaucoma, and pupil dilation. Occasionally, cocaine is mixed with adrenaline and sodium bicarbonate and used topically for surgery, a formulation called Moffett's solution.

Cocaine hydrochloride (Goprelto), an ester local anesthetic, was approved for medical use in the United States in December 2017, and is indicated for the introduction of local anesthesia of the mucous membranes for diagnostic procedures and surgeries on or through the nasal cavities of adults. Cocaine hydrochloride (Numbrino) was approved for medical use in the United States in January 2020.

The most common adverse reactions in people treated with Goprelto are headache and epistaxis. The most common adverse reactions in people treated with Numbrino are hypertension, tachycardia, and sinus tachycardia.

Recreational 
Cocaine is a central nervous system stimulant. Its effects can last from 15 minutes to an hour. The duration of cocaine's effects depends on the amount taken and the route of administration. Cocaine can be in the form of fine white powder, bitter to the taste. Crack cocaine is a smokeable form of cocaine made into small "rocks" by processing cocaine with sodium bicarbonate (baking soda) and water. Crack cocaine is referred to as "crack" because of the crackling sounds it makes when heated.

Cocaine use leads to increases in alertness, feelings of well-being and euphoria, increased energy and motor activity, and increased feelings of competence and sexuality.

Analysis of the correlation between the use of 18 various psychoactive substances shows that cocaine use correlates with other "party drugs" (such as ecstasy or amphetamines), as well as with heroin and benzodiazepines use, and can be considered as a bridge between the use of different groups of drugs.

Coca leaves 

It is legal for people to use Coca leaves in some Andean nations, such as Peru and Bolivia, where they are chewed, consumed in the form of tea, or are sometimes incorporated into food products. Coca leaves are typically mixed with an alkaline substance (such as lime) and chewed into a wad that is retained in the buccal pouch (mouth between gum and cheek, much the same as chewing tobacco is chewed) and sucked of its juices. The juices are absorbed slowly by the mucous membrane of the inner cheek and by the gastrointestinal tract when swallowed. Alternatively, coca leaves can be infused in liquid and consumed like tea. Coca tea, an infusion of coca leaves, is also a traditional method of consumption. The tea has often been recommended for travelers in the Andes to prevent altitude sickness. Its actual effectiveness has never been systematically studied.

In 1986 an article in the Journal of the American Medical Association revealed that U.S. health food stores were selling dried coca leaves to be prepared as an infusion as "Health Inca Tea". While the packaging claimed it had been "decocainized", no such process had actually taken place. The article stated that drinking two cups of the tea per day gave a mild stimulation, increased heart rate, and mood elevation, and the tea was essentially harmless.

Insufflation 

Nasal insufflation (known colloquially as "snorting", "sniffing", or "blowing") is a common method of ingestion of recreational powdered cocaine. The drug coats and is absorbed through the mucous membranes lining the nasal passages. Cocaine's desired euphoric effects are delayed when snorted through the nose by about five minutes. This occurs because cocaine's absorption is slowed by its constricting effect on the blood vessels of the nose. Insufflation of cocaine also leads to the longest duration of its effects (60–90 minutes). When insufflating cocaine, absorption through the nasal membranes is approximately 30–60%

In a study of cocaine users, the average time taken to reach peak subjective effects was 14.6 minutes. Any damage to the inside of the nose is due to cocaine constricting blood vessels – and therefore restricting blood and oxygen/nutrient flow – to that area.

Rolled up banknotes, hollowed-out pens, cut straws, pointed ends of keys, specialized spoons, long fingernails, and (clean) tampon applicators are often used to insufflate cocaine. The cocaine typically is poured onto a flat, hard surface (such as a mobile phone screen, mirror, CD case or book) and divided into "bumps", "lines" or "rails", and then insufflated. A 2001 study reported that the sharing of straws used to "snort" cocaine can spread blood diseases such as hepatitis C.

Injection 
Subjective effects not commonly shared with other methods of administration include a ringing in the ears moments after injection (usually when over 120 milligrams) lasting two to 5 minutes including tinnitus and audio distortion. This is colloquially referred to as a "bell ringer". In a study of cocaine users, the average time taken to reach peak subjective effects was 3.1 minutes. The euphoria passes quickly. Aside from the toxic effects of cocaine, there is also the danger of circulatory emboli from the insoluble substances that may be used to cut the drug. As with all injected illicit substances, there is a risk of the user contracting blood-borne infections if sterile injecting equipment is not available or used.

An injected mixture of cocaine and heroin, known as "speedball", is a particularly dangerous combination, as the converse effects of the drugs actually complement each other, but may also mask the symptoms of an overdose. It has been responsible for numerous deaths, including celebrities such as comedians/actors John Belushi and Chris Farley, Mitch Hedberg, River Phoenix, grunge singer Layne Staley and actor Philip Seymour Hoffman. Experimentally, cocaine injections can be delivered to animals such as fruit flies to study the mechanisms of cocaine addiction.

Inhalation 

The onset of cocaine's euphoric effects is fastest with inhalation, beginning after 3–5 seconds. However, inhalation gives the shortest duration of euphoria (5–15 minutes). Cocaine is smoked by inhaling the vapor produced when free base cocaine is heated to the point of sublimation. In a 2000 Brookhaven National Laboratory medical department study, based on self-reports of 32 people who used cocaine who participated in the study, "peak high" was found at a mean of 1.4min +/− 0.5 minutes. Pyrolysis products of cocaine that occur only when heated/smoked have been shown to change the effect profile, i.e. anhydroecgonine methyl ester, when co-administered with cocaine, increases the dopamine in CPu and NAc brain regions, and has M1− and M3− receptor affinity.

Smoking freebase cocaine is often accomplished using a pipe made from a small glass tube, often taken from "love roses", small glass tubes with a paper rose that are promoted as romantic gifts. These are sometimes called "stems", "horns", "blasters" and "straight shooters". A small piece of clean heavy copper or occasionally stainless steel scouring padoften called a "brillo" (actual Brillo Pads contain soap, and are not used) or "chore" (named for Chore Boy brand copper scouring pads)serves as a reduction base and flow modulator in which the "rock" can be melted and boiled to vapor. Crack is smoked by placing it at the end of the pipe; a flame held close to it produces vapor, which is then inhaled by the smoker. The effects felt almost immediately after smoking, are very intense and do not last long usually 2 to 10 minutes. When smoked, cocaine is sometimes combined with other drugs, such as cannabis, often rolled into a joint or blunt.

Effects

Acute 
Acute exposure to cocaine has many effects on humans, including euphoria, increases in heart rate and blood pressure, and increases in cortisol secretion from the adrenal gland. In humans with acute exposure followed by continuous exposure to cocaine at a constant blood concentration, the acute tolerance to the chronotropic cardiac effects of cocaine begins after about 10 minutes, while acute tolerance to the euphoric effects of cocaine begins after about one hour. With excessive or prolonged use, the drug can cause itching, fast heart rate, and paranoid delusions or sensations of insects crawling on the skin. Intranasal cocaine and crack use are both associated with pharmacological violence. Aggressive behavior may be displayed by both addicts and casual users. Cocaine can induce psychosis characterized by paranoia, impaired reality testing, hallucinations, irritability, and physical aggression. Cocaine intoxication can cause hyperawareness, hypervigilance, and psychomotor agitation and delirium. Consumption of large doses of cocaine can cause violent outbursts, especially by those with preexisting psychosis. Crack-related violence is also systemic, relating to disputes between crack dealers and users. Acute exposure may induce cardiac arrhythmias, including atrial fibrillation, supraventricular tachycardia, ventricular tachycardia, and ventricular fibrillation. Acute exposure may also lead to angina, heart attack, and congestive heart failure. Cocaine overdose may cause seizures, abnormally high body temperature and a marked elevation of blood pressure, which can be life-threatening, abnormal heart rhythms, and death. Anxiety, paranoia, and restlessness can also occur, especially during the comedown. With excessive dosage, tremors, convulsions and increased body temperature are observed. Severe cardiac adverse events, particularly sudden cardiac death, become a serious risk at high doses due to cocaine's blocking effect on cardiac sodium channels. Incidental exposure of the eye to sublimated cocaine while smoking crack cocaine can cause serious injury to the cornea and long-term loss of visual acuity.

Chronic 
Although it has been commonly asserted, the available evidence does not show that chronic use of cocaine is associated with broad cognitive deficits. Research is inconclusive on age-related loss of striatal dopamine transporter (DAT) sites, suggesting cocaine has neuroprotective or neurodegenerative properties for dopamine neurons. Exposure to cocaine may lead to the breakdown of the blood–brain barrier.

Physical side effects from chronic smoking of cocaine include coughing up blood, bronchospasm, itching, fever, diffuse alveolar infiltrates without effusions, pulmonary and systemic eosinophilia, chest pain, lung trauma, sore throat, asthma, hoarse voice, dyspnea (shortness of breath), and an aching, flu-like syndrome. Cocaine constricts blood vessels, dilates pupils, and increases body temperature, heart rate, and blood pressure. It can also cause headaches and gastrointestinal complications such as abdominal pain and nausea. A common but untrue belief is that the smoking of cocaine chemically breaks down tooth enamel and causes tooth decay. Cocaine can cause involuntary tooth grinding, known as bruxism, which can deteriorate tooth enamel and lead to gingivitis. Additionally, stimulants like cocaine, methamphetamine, and even caffeine cause dehydration and dry mouth. Since saliva is an important mechanism in maintaining one's oral pH level, people who use cocaine over a long period of time who do not hydrate sufficiently may experience demineralization of their teeth due to the pH of the tooth surface dropping too low (below 5.5). Cocaine use also promotes the formation of blood clots. This increase in blood clot formation is attributed to cocaine-associated increases in the activity of plasminogen activator inhibitor, and an increase in the number, activation, and aggregation of platelets.

Chronic intranasal usage can degrade the cartilage separating the nostrils (the septum nasi), leading eventually to its complete disappearance. Due to the absorption of the cocaine from cocaine hydrochloride, the remaining hydrochloride forms a dilute hydrochloric acid.

Illicitly-sold cocaine may be contaminated with levamisole. Levamisole may accentuate cocaine's effects. Levamisole-adulterated cocaine has been associated with autoimmune disease.

Cocaine use leads to an increased risk of hemorrhagic and ischemic strokes. Cocaine use also increases the risk of having a heart attack.

Addiction 

Relatives of persons with cocaine addiction have an increased risk of cocaine addiction. Cocaine addiction occurs through ΔFosB overexpression in the nucleus accumbens, which results in altered transcriptional regulation in neurons within the nucleus accumbens. ΔFosB levels have been found to increase upon the use of cocaine. Each subsequent dose of cocaine continues to increase ΔFosB levels with no ceiling of tolerance. Elevated levels of ΔFosB leads to increases in brain-derived neurotrophic factor (BDNF) levels, which in turn increases the number of dendritic branches and spines present on neurons involved with the nucleus accumbens and prefrontal cortex areas of the brain. This change can be identified rather quickly, and may be sustained weeks after the last dose of the drug.

Transgenic mice exhibiting inducible expression of ΔFosB primarily in the nucleus accumbens and dorsal striatum exhibit sensitized behavioural responses to cocaine. They self-administer cocaine at lower doses than control, but have a greater likelihood of relapse when the drug is withheld. ΔFosB increases the expression of AMPA receptor subunit GluR2 and also decreases expression of dynorphin, thereby enhancing sensitivity to reward.

DNA damage is increased in the brain of rodents by administration of cocaine. During DNA repair of such damages, persistent chromatin alterations may occur such as methylation of DNA or the acetylation or methylation of histones at the sites of repair.  These alterations can be epigenetic scars in the chromatin that contribute to the persistent epigenetic changes found in cocaine addiction.

In humans, cocaine abuse may cause structural changes in brain connectivity, though it is unclear to what extent these changes are permanent.

Dependence and withdrawal 
Cocaine dependence develops after even brief periods of regular cocaine use and produces a withdrawal state with emotional-motivational deficits upon cessation of cocaine use.

During pregnancy 

Crack baby is a term for a child born to a mother who used crack cocaine during her pregnancy. The threat that cocaine use during pregnancy poses to the fetus is now considered exaggerated. Studies show that prenatal cocaine exposure (independent of other effects such as, for example, alcohol, tobacco, or physical environment) has no appreciable effect on childhood growth and development.
However, the official opinion of the National Institute on Drug Abuse of the United States warns about health risks while cautioning against stereotyping:

There are also warnings about the threat of breastfeeding: The March of Dimes said "it is likely that cocaine will reach the baby through breast milk," and advises the following regarding cocaine use during pregnancy:

Mortality 
Persons with regular or problematic use of cocaine have a significantly higher rate of death, and are specifically at higher risk of traumatic deaths and deaths attributable to infectious disease.

Pharmacology

Pharmacokinetics 
The extent of absorption of cocaine into the systemic circulation after nasal insufflation is similar to that after oral ingestion. The rate of absorption after nasal insufflation is limited by cocaine-induced vasoconstriction of capillaries in the nasal mucosa. Onset of absorption after oral ingestion is delayed because cocaine is a weak base with a pKa of 8.6, and is thus in an ionized form that is poorly absorbed from the acidic stomach and easily absorbed from the alkaline duodenum. The rate and extent of absorption from inhalation of cocaine is similar or greater than with intravenous injection, as inhalation provides access directly to the pulmonary capillary bed. The delay in absorption after oral ingestion may account for the popular belief that cocaine bioavailability from the stomach is lower than after insufflation. Compared with ingestion, the faster absorption of insufflated cocaine results in quicker attainment of maximum drug effects. Snorting cocaine produces maximum physiological effects within 40 minutes and maximum psychotropic effects within 20 minutes. Physiological and psychotropic effects from nasally insufflated cocaine are sustained for approximately 40–60 minutes after the peak effects are attained.

Cocaine crosses the blood–brain barrier via both a proton-coupled organic cation antiporter and (to a lesser extent) via passive diffusion across cell membranes. As of September 2022, the gene or genes encoding the human proton-organic cation antiporter had not been identified.

Cocaine has a short elimination half life of 0.7–1.5 hours and is extensively metabolized by plasma esterases and also by liver cholinesterases, with only about 1% excreted unchanged in the urine. The metabolism is dominated by hydrolytic ester cleavage, so the eliminated metabolites consist mostly of benzoylecgonine (BE), the major metabolite, and other metabolites in lesser amounts such as ecgonine methyl ester (EME) and ecgonine. Further minor metabolites of cocaine include norcocaine, p-hydroxycocaine, m-hydroxycocaine, p-hydroxybenzoylecgonine (pOHBE), and m-hydroxybenzoylecgonine. If consumed with alcohol, cocaine combines with alcohol in the liver to form cocaethylene. Studies have suggested cocaethylene is more euphoric, and has a higher cardiovascular toxicity than cocaine by itself.

Depending on liver and kidney function, cocaine metabolites are detectable in urine. Benzoylecgonine can be detected in urine within four hours after cocaine intake and remains detectable in concentrations greater than 150 ng/mL typically for up to eight days after cocaine is used. Detection of cocaine metabolites in hair is possible in regular users until after the sections of hair grown during the period of cocaine use are cut or fall out.

Pharmacodynamics 

The pharmacodynamics of cocaine involve the complex relationships of neurotransmitters (inhibiting monoamine uptake in rats with ratios of about: serotonin:dopamine = 2:3, serotonin:norepinephrine = 2:5). The most extensively studied effect of cocaine on the central nervous system is the blockade of the dopamine transporter protein. Dopamine neurotransmitter released during neural signaling is normally recycled via the transporter; i.e., the transporter binds the transmitter and pumps it out of the synaptic cleft back into the presynaptic neuron, where it is taken up into storage vesicles. Cocaine binds tightly at the dopamine transporter forming a complex that blocks the transporter's function. The dopamine transporter can no longer perform its reuptake function, and thus dopamine accumulates in the synaptic cleft. The increased concentration of dopamine in the synapse activates post-synaptic dopamine receptors, which makes the drug rewarding and promotes the compulsive use of cocaine.

Cocaine affects certain serotonin (5-HT) receptors; in particular, it has been shown to antagonize the 5-HT3 receptor, which is a ligand-gated ion channel. An overabundance of 5-HT3 receptors is reported in cocaine-conditioned rats, though 5-HT3's role is unclear. The 5-HT2 receptor (particularly the subtypes 5-HT2A, 5-HT2B and 5-HT2C) are involved in the locomotor-activating effects of cocaine.

Cocaine has been demonstrated to bind as to directly stabilize the DAT transporter on the open outward-facing conformation. Further, cocaine binds in such a way as to inhibit a hydrogen bond innate to DAT. Cocaine's binding properties are such that it attaches so this hydrogen bond will not form and is blocked from formation due to the tightly locked orientation of the cocaine molecule. Research studies have suggested that the affinity for the transporter is not what is involved in the habituation of the substance so much as the conformation and binding properties to where and how on the transporter the molecule binds.

Sigma receptors are affected by cocaine, as cocaine functions as a sigma ligand agonist. Further specific receptors it has been demonstrated to function on are NMDA and the D1 dopamine receptor.

Cocaine also blocks sodium channels, thereby interfering with the propagation of action potentials; thus, like lignocaine and novocaine, it acts as a local anesthetic. It also functions on the binding sites to the dopamine and serotonin sodium dependent transport area as targets as separate mechanisms from its reuptake of those transporters; unique to its local anesthetic value which makes it in a class of functionality different from both its own derived phenyltropanes analogues which have that removed. In addition to this, cocaine has some target binding to the site of the Kappa-opioid receptor. Cocaine also causes vasoconstriction, thus reducing bleeding during minor surgical procedures. Recent research points to an important role of circadian mechanisms and clock genes in behavioral actions of cocaine.

Cocaine is known to suppress hunger and appetite by increasing co-localization of sigma σ1R receptors and ghrelin GHS-R1a receptors at the neuronal cell surface, thereby increasing ghrelin-mediated signaling of satiety and possibly via other effects on appetitive hormones. Chronic users may lose their appetite and can experience severe malnutrition and significant weight loss.

Cocaine effects, further, are shown to be potentiated for the user when used in conjunction with new surroundings and stimuli, and otherwise novel environs.

Chemistry

Appearance 

Cocaine in its purest form is a white, pearly product. Cocaine appearing in powder form is a salt, typically cocaine hydrochloride. Street cocaine is often adulterated or "cut" with talc, lactose, sucrose, glucose, mannitol, inositol, caffeine, procaine, phencyclidine, phenytoin, lignocaine, strychnine, levamisole, amphetamine, or heroin.

The color of "crack" cocaine depends upon several factors including the origin of the cocaine used, the method of preparation – with ammonia or baking soda – and the presence of impurities. It will generally range from white to a yellowish cream to a light brown. Its texture will also depend on the adulterants, origin, and processing of the powdered cocaine, and the method of converting the base. It ranges from a crumbly texture, sometimes extremely oily, to a hard, almost crystalline nature.

Forms

Salts 
Cocaine – a tropane alkaloid – is a weakly alkaline compound, and can therefore combine with acidic compounds to form salts. The hydrochloride (HCl) salt of cocaine is by far the most commonly encountered, although the sulfate (SO42-) and the nitrate (NO3−) salts are occasionally seen. Different salts dissolve to a greater or lesser extent in various solvents – the hydrochloride salt is polar in character and is quite soluble in water.

Base 

As the name implies, "freebase" is the base form of cocaine, as opposed to the salt form. It is practically insoluble in water whereas hydrochloride salt is water-soluble.

Smoking freebase cocaine has the additional effect of releasing methylecgonidine into the user's system due to the pyrolysis of the substance (a side effect which insufflating or injecting powder cocaine does not create). Some research suggests that smoking freebase cocaine can be even more cardiotoxic than other routes of administration because of methylecgonidine's effects on lung tissue and liver tissue.

Pure cocaine is prepared by neutralizing its compounding salt with an alkaline solution, which will precipitate non-polar basic cocaine. It is further refined through aqueous-solvent liquid–liquid extraction.

Crack cocaine 

Crack is usually smoked in a glass pipe, and once inhaled, it passes from the lungs directly to the central nervous system, producing an almost immediate "high" that can be very powerful – this initial crescendo of stimulation is known as a "rush". This is followed by an equally intense low, leaving the user craving more drug. Addiction to crack usually occurs with four to six weeks; much more rapidly than with regular cocaine.

Powder cocaine (cocaine hydrochloride) must be heated to a high temperature (about 197 °C), and considerable decomposition/burning occurs at these high temperatures. This effectively destroys some of the cocaine and yields a sharp, acrid, and foul-tasting smoke.

Crack is a lower purity form of free-base cocaine that is usually produced by neutralization of cocaine hydrochloride with a solution of baking soda (sodium bicarbonate, NaHCO3) and water, producing a very hard/brittle, off-white-to-brown colored, amorphous material that contains sodium carbonate, entrapped water, and other by-products as the main impurities. The origin of the name "crack" comes from the "crackling" sound (and hence the onomatopoeic moniker "crack") that is produced when the cocaine and its impurities (i.e. water, sodium bicarbonate) are heated past the point of vaporization.

Coca leaf infusions 
Coca herbal infusion (also referred to as coca tea) is used in coca-leaf producing countries much as any herbal medicinal infusion would elsewhere in the world. The free and legal commercialization of dried coca leaves under the form of filtration bags to be used as "coca tea" has been actively promoted by the governments of Peru and Bolivia for many years as a drink having medicinal powers. In Peru, the National Coca Company, a state-run corporation, sells cocaine-infused teas and other medicinal products and also exports leaves to the U.S. for medicinal use.

Visitors to the city of Cuzco in Peru, and La Paz in Bolivia are greeted with the offering of coca leaf infusions (prepared in teapots with whole coca leaves) purportedly to help the newly arrived traveler overcome the malaise of high altitude sickness. The effects of drinking coca tea are mild stimulation and mood lift. It has also been promoted as an adjuvant for the treatment of cocaine dependence. One study on coca leaf infusion used with counseling in the treatment of 23 addicted coca-paste smokers in Lima, Peru found that the relapses rate fell from 4.35 times per month on average before coca tea treatment to one during treatment. The duration of abstinence increased from an average of 32 days before treatment to 217.2 days during treatment. This suggests that coca leaf infusion plus counseling may be effective at preventing relapse during cocaine addiction treatment.

There is little information on the pharmacological and toxicological effects of consuming coca tea. A chemical analysis by solid-phase extraction and gas chromatography–mass spectrometry (SPE-GC/MS) of Peruvian and Bolivian tea bags indicated the presence of significant amounts of cocaine, the metabolite benzoylecgonine, ecgonine methyl ester and trans-cinnamoylcocaine in coca tea bags and coca tea. Urine specimens were also analyzed from an individual who consumed one cup of coca tea and it was determined that enough cocaine and cocaine-related metabolites were present to produce a positive drug test.

Synthesis

Biosynthesis 

The first synthesis and elucidation of the cocaine molecule was by Richard Willstätter in 1898. Willstätter's synthesis derived cocaine from tropinone. Since then, Robert Robinson and Edward Leete have made significant contributions to the mechanism of the synthesis. (-NO3)

The additional carbon atoms required for the synthesis of cocaine are derived from acetyl-CoA, by addition of two acetyl-CoA units to the N-methyl-Δ1-pyrrolinium cation. The first addition is a Mannich-like reaction with the enolate anion from acetyl-CoA acting as a nucleophile towards the pyrrolinium cation. The second addition occurs through a Claisen condensation. This produces a racemic mixture of the 2-substituted pyrrolidine, with the retention of the thioester from the Claisen condensation. In formation of tropinone from racemic ethyl [2,3-13C2]4(Nmethyl-2-pyrrolidinyl)-3-oxobutanoate there is no preference for either stereoisomer. In cocaine biosynthesis, only the (S)-enantiomer can cyclize to form the tropane ring system of cocaine. The stereoselectivity of this reaction was further investigated through study of prochiral methylene hydrogen discrimination. This is due to the extra chiral center at C-2. This process occurs through an oxidation, which regenerates the pyrrolinium cation and formation of an enolate anion, and an intramolecular Mannich reaction. The tropane ring system undergoes hydrolysis, SAM-dependent methylation, and reduction via NADPH for the formation of methylecgonine. The benzoyl moiety required for the formation of the cocaine diester is synthesized from phenylalanine via cinnamic acid. Benzoyl-CoA then combines the two units to form cocaine.

N-methyl-pyrrolinium cation 

The biosynthesis begins with L-Glutamine, which is derived to L-ornithine in plants. The major contribution of L-ornithine and L-arginine as a precursor to the tropane ring was confirmed by Edward Leete. Ornithine then undergoes a pyridoxal phosphate-dependent decarboxylation to form putrescine. In some animals, the urea cycle derives putrescine from ornithine. L-ornithine is converted to L-arginine, which is then decarboxylated via PLP to form agmatine. Hydrolysis of the imine derives N-carbamoylputrescine followed with hydrolysis of the urea to form putrescine. The separate pathways of converting ornithine to putrescine in plants and animals have converged. A SAM-dependent N-methylation of putrescine gives the N-methylputrescine product, which then undergoes oxidative deamination by the action of diamine oxidase to yield the aminoaldehyde. Schiff base formation confirms the biosynthesis of the N-methyl-Δ1-pyrrolinium cation.

Robert Robinson's acetonedicarboxylate 
The biosynthesis of the tropane alkaloid is still not understood. Hemscheidt proposes that Robinson's acetonedicarboxylate emerges as a potential intermediate for this reaction. Condensation of N-methylpyrrolinium and acetonedicarboxylate would generate the oxobutyrate. Decarboxylation leads to tropane alkaloid formation.

Reduction of tropinone 
The reduction of tropinone is mediated by NADPH-dependent reductase enzymes, which have been characterized in multiple plant species. These plant species all contain two types of the reductase enzymes, tropinone reductase I and tropinone reductase II. TRI produces tropine and TRII produces pseudotropine. Due to differing kinetic and pH/activity characteristics of the enzymes and by the 25-fold higher activity of TRI over TRII, the majority of the tropinone reduction is from TRI to form tropine.

GMO synthesis

Research 
In 2022, a GMO produced N. benthamiana were discovered that were able to produce 25% of the amount of cocaine found in a coca plant.

Detection in body fluids 
Cocaine and its major metabolites may be quantified in blood, plasma, or urine to monitor for use, confirm a diagnosis of poisoning, or assist in the forensic investigation of a traffic or other criminal violation or sudden death. Most commercial cocaine immunoassay screening tests cross-react appreciably with the major cocaine metabolites, but chromatographic techniques can easily distinguish and separately measure each of these substances. When interpreting the results of a test, it is important to consider the cocaine usage history of the individual, since a chronic user can develop tolerance to doses that would incapacitate a cocaine-naive individual, and the chronic user often has high baseline values of the metabolites in his system. Cautious interpretation of testing results may allow a distinction between passive or active usage, and between smoking versus other routes of administration.

Field analysis 

Cocaine may be detected by law enforcement using the Scott reagent. The test can easily generate false positives for common substances and must be confirmed with a laboratory test.

Approximate cocaine purity can be determined using 1 mL 2% cupric sulfate pentahydrate in dilute HCl, 1 mL 2% potassium thiocyanate and 2 mL of chloroform. The shade of brown shown by the chloroform is proportional to the cocaine content. This test is not cross sensitive to heroin, methamphetamine, benzocaine, procaine and a number of other drugs but other chemicals could cause false positives.

Usage 

According to a 2016 United Nations report, England and Wales are the countries with the highest rate of cocaine usage (2.4% of adults in the previous year). Other countries where the usage rate meets or exceeds 1.5% are Spain and Scotland (2.2%), the United States (2.1%), Australia (2.1%), Uruguay (1.8%), Brazil (1.75%), Chile (1.73%), the Netherlands (1.5%) and Ireland (1.5%).

Europe 
Cocaine is the second most popular illegal recreational drug in Europe (behind cannabis). Since the mid-1990s, overall cocaine usage in Europe has been on the rise, but usage rates and attitudes tend to vary between countries. European countries with the highest usage rates are the United Kingdom, Spain, Italy, and the Republic of Ireland.

Approximately 17 million Europeans (5.1%) have used cocaine at least once and 3.5 million (1.1%) in the last year. About 1.9% (2.3 million) of young adults (15–34 years old) have used cocaine in the last year (latest data available as of 2018).

Usage is particularly prevalent among this demographic: 4% to 7% of males have used cocaine in the last year in Spain, Denmark, the Republic of Ireland, Italy, and the United Kingdom. The ratio of male to female users is approximately 3.8:1, but this statistic varies from 1:1 to 13:1 depending on country.

In 2014 London had the highest amount of cocaine in its sewage out of 50 European cities.

United States 

Cocaine is the second most popular illegal recreational drug in the United States (behind cannabis) and the U.S. is the world's largest consumer of cocaine. Its users span over different ages, races, and professions. In the 1970s and 1980s, the drug became particularly popular in the disco culture as cocaine usage was very common and popular in many discos such as Studio 54.

Dependence treatment 
Treatment with contingency management, such as providing vouchers for retail items contingent upon objectively-verified abstinence from recent drug use, has been shown in randomized clinical trials to significantly reduce the likelihood of having a positive test for the presence of cocaine.

Vaccine 
TA-CD is an active vaccine developed by the Xenova Group which is used to negate the effects of cocaine, making it suitable for use in treatment of addiction. It is created by combining norcocaine with inactivated cholera toxin.

History

Discovery 

Indigenous peoples of South America have chewed the leaves of Erythroxylon coca – a plant that contains vital nutrients as well as numerous alkaloids, including cocaine – for over a thousand years. The coca leaf was, and still is, chewed almost universally by some indigenous communities. The remains of coca leaves have been found with ancient Peruvian mummies, and pottery from the time period depicts humans with bulged cheeks, indicating the presence of something on which they are chewing. There is also evidence that these cultures used a mixture of coca leaves and saliva as an anesthetic for the performance of trepanation.

When the Spanish arrived in South America, the conquistadors at first banned coca as an "evil agent of devil". But after discovering that without the coca the locals were barely able to work, the conquistadors legalized and taxed the leaf, taking 10% off the value of each crop. In 1569, Spanish botanist Nicolás Monardes described the indigenous peoples' practice of chewing a mixture of tobacco and coca leaves to induce "great contentment":

In 1609, Padre Blas Valera wrote:

Isolation and naming 
Although the stimulant and hunger-suppressant properties of coca had been known for many centuries, the isolation of the cocaine alkaloid was not achieved until 1855. Various European scientists had attempted to isolate cocaine, but none had been successful for two reasons: the knowledge of chemistry required was insufficient at the time, and contemporary conditions of sea-shipping from South America could degrade the cocaine in the plant samples available to European chemists.

The cocaine alkaloid was first isolated by the German chemist Friedrich Gaedcke in 1855. Gaedcke named the alkaloid "erythroxyline", and published a description in the journal Archiv der Pharmazie.

In 1856, Friedrich Wöhler asked Dr. Carl Scherzer, a scientist aboard the Novara (an Austrian frigate sent by Emperor Franz Joseph to circle the globe), to bring him a large amount of coca leaves from South America. In 1859, the ship finished its travels and Wöhler received a trunk full of coca. Wöhler passed on the leaves to Albert Niemann, a PhD student at the University of Göttingen in Germany, who then developed an improved purification process.

Niemann described every step he took to isolate cocaine in his dissertation titled Über eine neue organische Base in den Cocablättern (On a New Organic Base in the Coca Leaves), which was published in 1860 and earned him his Ph.D. He wrote of the alkaloid's "colourless transparent prisms" and said that "Its solutions have an alkaline reaction, a bitter taste, promote the flow of saliva and leave a peculiar numbness, followed by a sense of cold when applied to the tongue." Niemann named the alkaloid "cocaine" from "coca" (from Quechua "kúka") + suffix "ine".

The first synthesis and elucidation of the structure of the cocaine molecule was by Richard Willstätter in 1898. It was the first biomimetic synthesis of an organic structure recorded in academic chemical literature. The synthesis started from tropinone, a related natural product and took five steps.

Because of the former use of cocaine as a local anesthetic, a suffix "-caine" was later extracted and used to form names of synthetic local anesthetics.

Medicalization 

With the discovery of this new alkaloid, Western medicine was quick to exploit the possible uses of this plant.

In 1879, Vassili von Anrep, of the University of Würzburg, devised an experiment to demonstrate the analgesic properties of the newly discovered alkaloid. He prepared two separate jars, one containing a cocaine-salt solution, with the other containing merely saltwater. He then submerged a frog's legs into the two jars, one leg in the treatment and one in the control solution, and proceeded to stimulate the legs in several different ways. The leg that had been immersed in the cocaine solution reacted very differently from the leg that had been immersed in saltwater.

Karl Koller (a close associate of Sigmund Freud, who would write about cocaine later) experimented with cocaine for ophthalmic usage. In an infamous experiment in 1884, he experimented upon himself by applying a cocaine solution to his own eye and then pricking it with pins. His findings were presented to the Heidelberg Ophthalmological Society. Also in 1884, Jellinek demonstrated the effects of cocaine as a respiratory system anesthetic. In 1885, William Halsted demonstrated nerve-block anesthesia, and James Leonard Corning demonstrated peridural anesthesia. 1898 saw Heinrich Quincke use cocaine for spinal anesthesia.

Popularization 

In 1859, an Italian doctor, Paolo Mantegazza, returned from Peru, where he had witnessed first-hand the use of coca by the local indigenous peoples. He proceeded to experiment on himself and upon his return to Milan, he wrote a paper in which he described the effects. In this paper, he declared coca and cocaine (at the time they were assumed to be the same) as being useful medicinally, in the treatment of "a furred tongue in the morning, flatulence, and whitening of the teeth."

A chemist named Angelo Mariani who read Mantegazza's paper became immediately intrigued with coca and its economic potential. In 1863, Mariani started marketing a wine called Vin Mariani, which had been treated with coca leaves, to become coca wine. The ethanol in wine acted as a solvent and extracted the cocaine from the coca leaves, altering the drink's effect. It contained 6 mg cocaine per ounce of wine, but Vin Mariani which was to be exported contained 7.2 mg per ounce, to compete with the higher cocaine content of similar drinks in the United States. A "pinch of coca leaves" was included in John Styth Pemberton's original 1886 recipe for Coca-Cola, though the company began using decocainized leaves in 1906 when the Pure Food and Drug Act was passed.

In 1879 cocaine began to be used to treat morphine addiction. Cocaine was introduced into clinical use as a local anesthetic in Germany in 1884, about the same time as Sigmund Freud published his work Über Coca, in which he wrote that cocaine causes:

By 1885 the U.S. manufacturer Parke-Davis sold coca-leaf cigarettes and cheroots, a cocaine inhalant, a Coca Cordial, cocaine crystals, and cocaine solution for intravenous injection. The company promised that its cocaine products would "supply the place of food, make the coward brave, the silent eloquent and render the sufferer insensitive to pain."

By the late Victorian era, cocaine use had appeared as a vice in literature. For example, it was injected by Arthur Conan Doyle's fictional Sherlock Holmes, generally to offset the boredom he felt when he was not working on a case.

In early 20th-century Memphis, Tennessee, cocaine was sold in neighborhood drugstores on Beale Street, costing five or ten cents for a small boxful. Stevedores along the Mississippi River used the drug as a stimulant, and white employers encouraged its use by black laborers.

In 1909, Ernest Shackleton took "Forced March" brand cocaine tablets to Antarctica, as did Captain Scott a year later on his ill-fated journey to the South Pole.

In the 1931 song "Minnie the Moocher", Cab Calloway heavily references cocaine use. He uses the phrase "kicking the gong around", slang for cocaine use; describes titular character Minnie as "tall and skinny;" and describes Smokey Joe as "cokey". In the 1932 comedy musical film The Big Broadcast, Cab Calloway performs the song with his orchestra and mimes snorting cocaine in between verses.

During the mid-1940s, amidst World War II, cocaine was considered for inclusion as an ingredient of a future generation of 'pep pills' for the German military, code named D-IX.

In modern popular culture, references to cocaine are common. The drug has a glamorous image associated with the wealthy, famous and powerful, and is said to make users "feel rich and beautiful". In addition the pace of modern society − such as in finance − gives many the incentive to make use of the drug.

Modern usage 

In many countries, cocaine is a popular recreational drug. In the United States, the development of "crack" cocaine introduced the substance to a generally poorer inner-city market. The use of the powder form has stayed relatively constant, experiencing a new height of use during the late 1990s and early 2000s in the U.S., and has become much more popular in the last few years in the UK. 

Cocaine use is prevalent across all socioeconomic strata, including age, demographics, economic, social, political, religious, and livelihood.

The estimated U.S. cocaine market exceeded US$70 billion in street value for the year 2005, exceeding revenues by corporations such as Starbucks. Cocaine's status as a club drug shows its immense popularity among the "party crowd".

In 1995 the World Health Organization (WHO) and the United Nations Interregional Crime and Justice Research Institute (UNICRI) announced in a press release the publication of the results of the largest global study on cocaine use ever undertaken. An American representative in the World Health Assembly banned the publication of the study, because it seemed to make a case for the positive uses of cocaine. An excerpt of the report strongly conflicted with accepted paradigms, for example, "that occasional cocaine use does not typically lead to severe or even minor physical or social problems." In the sixth meeting of the B committee, the US representative threatened that "If World Health Organization activities relating to drugs failed to reinforce proven drug control approaches, funds for the relevant programs should be curtailed". This led to the decision to discontinue publication. A part of the study was recuperated and published in 2010, including profiles of cocaine use in 20 countries, but are unavailable .

In October 2010 it was reported that the use of cocaine in Australia has doubled since monitoring began in 2003.

A problem with illegal cocaine use, especially in the higher volumes used to combat fatigue (rather than increase euphoria) by long-term users, is the risk of ill effects or damage caused by the compounds used in adulteration. Cutting or "stepping on" the drug is commonplace, using compounds which simulate ingestion effects, such as Novocain (procaine) producing temporary anesthesia, as many users believe a strong numbing effect is the result of strong and/or pure cocaine, ephedrine or similar stimulants that are to produce an increased heart rate. The normal adulterants for profit are inactive sugars, usually mannitol, creatine, or glucose, so introducing active adulterants gives the illusion of purity and to 'stretch' or make it so a dealer can sell more product than without the adulterants. The adulterant of sugars allows the dealer to sell the product for a higher price because of the illusion of purity and allows the sale of more of the product at that higher price, enabling dealers to significantly increase revenue with little additional cost for the adulterants. A 2007 study by the European Monitoring Centre for Drugs and Drug Addiction showed that the purity levels for street purchased cocaine was often under 5% and on average under 50% pure.

Society and culture

Legal status 

The production, distribution, and sale of cocaine products is restricted (and illegal in most contexts) in most countries as regulated by the Single Convention on Narcotic Drugs, and the United Nations Convention Against Illicit Traffic in Narcotic Drugs and Psychotropic Substances. In the United States the manufacture, importation, possession, and distribution of cocaine are additionally regulated by the 1970 Controlled Substances Act.

Some countries, such as Peru and Bolivia, permit the cultivation of coca leaf for traditional consumption by the local indigenous population, but nevertheless, prohibit the production, sale, and consumption of cocaine. The provisions as to how much a coca farmer can yield annually is protected by laws such as the Bolivian Cato accord. In addition, some parts of Europe, the United States, and Australia allow processed cocaine for medicinal uses only.

Australia 
Cocaine is a Schedule 8 prohibited substance in Australia under the Poisons Standard (July 2016). A schedule 8 substance is a controlled Drug – Substances which should be available for use but require the restriction of manufacture, supply, distribution, possession and use to reduce abuse, misuse, and physical or psychological dependence.

In Western Australia under the Misuse of Drugs Act 1981 4.0g of cocaine is the amount of prohibited drugs determining a court of trial, 2.0g is the amount of cocaine required for the presumption of intention to sell or supply and 28.0g is the amount of cocaine required for purposes of drug trafficking.

United States 

The US federal government instituted a national labeling requirement for cocaine and cocaine-containing products through the Pure Food and Drug Act of 1906. The next important federal regulation was the Harrison Narcotics Tax Act of 1914. While this act is often seen as the start of prohibition, the act itself was not actually a prohibition on cocaine, but instead set up a regulatory and licensing regime. The Harrison Act did not recognize addiction as a treatable condition and therefore the therapeutic use of cocaine, heroin, or morphine to such individuals was outlawed leading a 1915 editorial in the journal American Medicine to remark that the addict "is denied the medical care he urgently needs, open, above-board sources from which he formerly obtained his drug supply are closed to him, and he is driven to the underworld where he can get his drug, but of course, surreptitiously and in violation of the law." The Harrison Act left manufacturers of cocaine untouched so long as they met certain purity and labeling standards. Despite that cocaine was typically illegal to sell and legal outlets were rarer, the quantities of legal cocaine produced declined very little. Legal cocaine quantities did not decrease until the Jones–Miller Act of 1922 put serious restrictions on cocaine manufactures.

Before the early 1900s, the primary problem caused by cocaine use was portrayed by newspapers to be addiction, not violence or crime, and the cocaine user was represented as an upper- or middle-class White person. In 1914, The New York Times published an article titled "Negro Cocaine 'Fiends' Are a New Southern Menace", portraying Black cocaine users as dangerous and able to withstand wounds that would normally be fatal. The Anti-Drug Abuse Act of 1986 mandated prison sentences for 500 grams of powdered cocaine and 5 grams of crack cocaine. In the National Survey on Drug Use and Health, Whites reported a higher rate of powdered cocaine use, and Blacks reported a higher rate of crack cocaine use.

Interdiction 

In 2004, according to the United Nations, 589 tonnes of cocaine were seized globally by law enforcement authorities. Colombia seized 188 t, the United States 166 t, Europe 79 t, Peru 14 t, Bolivia 9 t, and the rest of the world 133 t.

Production 
Colombia is as of 2019 the world's largest cocaine producer, with production more than tripling since 2013. Three-quarters of the world's annual yield of cocaine has been produced in Colombia, both from cocaine base imported from Peru (primarily the Huallaga Valley) and Bolivia and from locally grown coca. There was a 28% increase in the amount of potentially harvestable coca plants which were grown in Colombia in 1998. This, combined with crop reductions in Bolivia and Peru, made Colombia the nation with the largest area of coca under cultivation after the mid-1990s. Coca grown for traditional purposes by indigenous communities, a use which is still present and is permitted by Colombian laws, only makes up a small fragment of total coca production, most of which is used for the illegal drug trade.

An interview with a coca farmer published in 2003 described a mode of production by acid-base extraction that has changed little since 1905. Roughly  of leaves were harvested per hectare, six times per year. The leaves were dried for half a day, then chopped into small pieces with a string trimmer and sprinkled with a small amount of powdered cement (replacing sodium carbonate from former times). Then battery acid (weak sulfuric acid) was used, one bucket per  of leaves, to create a phase separation in which the cocaine free base in the gasoline was acidified and extracted into a few buckets of "murky-looking smelly liquid". Once powdered caustic soda was added to this, the cocaine precipitated and could be removed by filtration through a cloth. The resulting material, when dried, was termed pasta and sold by the farmer. The 3750 pound yearly harvest of leaves from a hectare produced  of pasta, approximately 40–60% cocaine. Repeated recrystallization from solvents, producing pasta lavada and eventually crystalline cocaine were performed at specialized laboratories after the sale.

Attempts to eradicate coca fields through the use of defoliants have devastated part of the farming economy in some coca-growing regions of Colombia, and strains appear to have been developed that are more resistant or immune to their use. Whether these strains are natural mutations or the product of human tampering is unclear. These strains have also shown to be more potent than those previously grown, increasing profits for the drug cartels responsible for the exporting of cocaine. Although production fell temporarily, coca crops rebounded in numerous smaller fields in Colombia, rather than the larger plantations.

The cultivation of coca has become an attractive economic decision for many growers due to the combination of several factors, including the lack of other employment alternatives, the lower profitability of alternative crops in official crop substitution programs, the eradication-related damages to non-drug farms, the spread of new strains of the coca plant due to persistent worldwide demand.

The latest estimate provided by the U.S. authorities on the annual production of cocaine in Colombia refers to 290 metric tons.
As of the end of 2011, the seizure operations of Colombian cocaine carried out in different countries have totaled 351.8 metric tons of cocaine, i.e. 121.3% of Colombia's annual production according to the U.S. Department of State's estimates.

Synthesis 
Synthesizing cocaine could eliminate the high visibility and low reliability of offshore sources and international smuggling, replacing them with clandestine domestic laboratories, as are common for illicit methamphetamine, but is rarely done. Natural cocaine remains the lowest cost and highest quality supply of cocaine. Formation of inactive stereoisomers (cocaine has four chiral centres – 1R 2R, 3S, and 5S, two of them dependent, hence eight possible stereoisomers) plus synthetic by-products limits the yield and purity.

Trafficking and distribution 

Organized criminal gangs operating on a large scale dominate the cocaine trade. Most cocaine is grown and processed in South America, particularly in Colombia, Bolivia, Peru, and smuggled into the United States and Europe, the United States being the world's largest consumer of cocaine, where it is sold at huge markups; usually in the US at $80–120 for 1 gram, and $250–300 for 3.5 grams ( of an ounce, or an "eight ball").

Caribbean and Mexican routes 
The primary cocaine importation points in the United States have been in Arizona, southern California, southern Florida, and Texas. Typically, land vehicles are driven across the U.S.–Mexico border. Sixty-five percent of cocaine enters the United States through Mexico, and the vast majority of the rest enters through Florida. , the Sinaloa Cartel is the most active drug cartel involved in smuggling illicit drugs like cocaine into the United States and trafficking them throughout the United States.

Cocaine traffickers from Colombia and Mexico have established a labyrinth of smuggling routes throughout the Caribbean, the Bahama Island chain, and South Florida. They often hire traffickers from Mexico or the Dominican Republic to transport the drug using a variety of smuggling techniques to U.S. markets.

Chilean route 
Another route of cocaine traffic goes through Chile, which is primarily used for cocaine produced in Bolivia since the nearest seaports lie in northern Chile. The arid Bolivia–Chile border is easily crossed by 4×4 vehicles that then head to the seaports of Iquique and Antofagasta. While the price of cocaine is higher in Chile than in Peru and Bolivia, the final destination is usually Europe, especially Spain where drug dealing networks exist among South American immigrants.

Techniques 
Cocaine is also carried in small, concealed, kilogram quantities across the border by couriers known as "mules" (or "mulas"), who cross a border either legally, for example, through a port or airport, or illegally elsewhere. The drugs may be strapped to the waist or legs or hidden in bags, or hidden in the body. If the mule gets through without being caught, the gangs will reap most of the profits. If caught, gangs will sever all links and the mule will usually stand trial for trafficking alone.

Bulk cargo ships are also used to smuggle cocaine to staging sites in the western Caribbean–Gulf of Mexico area. These vessels are typically 150–250-foot (50–80 m) coastal freighters that carry an average cocaine load of approximately 2.5 tonnes. Commercial fishing vessels are also used for smuggling operations. In areas with a high volume of recreational traffic, smugglers use the same types of vessels, such as go-fast boats, like those used by the local populations.

Sophisticated drug subs are the latest tool drug runners are using to bring cocaine north from Colombia, it was reported on 20 March 2008. Although the vessels were once viewed as a quirky sideshow in the drug war, they are becoming faster, more seaworthy, and capable of carrying bigger loads of drugs than earlier models, according to those charged with catching them.

Sales to consumers 

Cocaine is readily available in all major countries' metropolitan areas. According to the Summer 1998 Pulse Check, published by the U.S. Office of National Drug Control Policy, cocaine use had stabilized across the country, with a few increases reported in San Diego, Bridgeport, Miami, and Boston. In the West, cocaine usage was lower, which was thought to be due to a switch to methamphetamine among some users; methamphetamine is cheaper, three and a half times more powerful, and lasts 12–24 times longer with each dose. Nevertheless, the number of cocaine users remain high, with a large concentration among urban youth.

In addition to the amounts previously mentioned, cocaine can be sold in "bill sizes":  for example, $10 might purchase a "dime bag", a very small amount (0.1–0.15 g) of cocaine. These amounts and prices are very popular among young people because they are inexpensive and easily concealed on one's body. Quality and price can vary dramatically depending on supply and demand, and on geographic region.

In 2008, the European Monitoring Centre for Drugs and Drug Addiction reports that the typical retail price of cocaine varied between €50 and €75 per gram in most European countries, although Cyprus, Romania, Sweden, and Turkey reported much higher values.

Consumption 
World annual cocaine consumption, as of 2000, stood at around 600 tonnes, with the United States consuming around 300 t, 50% of the total, Europe about 150 t, 25% of the total, and the rest of the world the remaining 150 t or 25%. It is estimated that 1.5 million people in the United States used cocaine in 2010, down from 2.4 million in 2006. Conversely, cocaine use appears to be increasing in Europe with the highest prevalences in Spain, the United Kingdom, Italy, and Ireland.

The 2010 UN World Drug Report concluded that "it appears that the North American cocaine market has declined in value from US$47 billion in 1998 to US$38 billion in 2008. Between 2006 and 2008, the value of the market remained basically stable".

See also 

 Black cocaine
 Coca alkaloids
 Coca eradication
 Cocaine and amphetamine regulated transcript
 Cocaine Anonymous
 Cocaine Cowboys
 Cocaine paste
 
 Crack epidemic
 Illegal drug trade in Latin America
 Coca production in Colombia
 Clan del Golfo
 Legal status of cocaine
 List of cocaine analogues
 List of countries by prevalence of cocaine use
 Methylphenidate
 Modafinil
 Pre-Columbian trans-oceanic evidence for cocaine in ancient Egypt
 Prenatal cocaine exposure
 Route 36, cocaine bar in Bolivia
 Tranquilandia
 Ypadu

References

General bibliography

Further reading

External links 

 
 
  — A collection of data about cocaine including dose, effects, chemistry, legal status, images and more.
 
  Data on cocaine trafficking worldwide.

 
Alkaloids found in Erythroxylum
Anorectics
Benzoate esters
Carboxylate esters
Cardiac stimulants
CYP2D6 inhibitors
Euphoriants
German inventions
Glycine receptor agonists
Local anesthetics
Methyl esters
Otologicals
Powders
Secondary metabolites
Serotonin–norepinephrine–dopamine reuptake inhibitors
Sigma agonists
Stimulants
Sympathomimetic amines
Teratogens
Tropane alkaloids found in Erythroxylum coca
Vasoconstrictors
Wikipedia medicine articles ready to translate